= Delian League (band) =

Metal band from New Jersey

Delian League is a metal band from New Jersey. In 2005 they released their album titled Truth in Chaos.

The members of Delian League are:

- Jude Andrade – Vocals
- Shane Boulos – Bass
- Richard Broadhead – Guitar
- David Hatfield – Guitar
- Joe Dooling – Drums
